Ellen Frothingham (25 March 1835 - 1902) worked in the United States as a translator of German-language works into English.

Biography
She was born in Boston, the daughter of Nathaniel Frothingham. She studied German literature, and was well known for her translations into English of Lessing's Nathan der Weise (Kuno Fischer's edition; New York, 1868), Goethe's Hermann und Dorothea (1870), Berthold Auerbach's Edelweiss (1871), Lessing's Laokoon (1874) and Franz Grillparzer's Sappho (1876).

Notes

References

External links

 
 

1835 births
1902 deaths
Writers from Boston
German–English translators
19th-century American translators
19th-century American women writers